The 2013–14 UCI Asia Tour was the 10th season of the UCI Asia Tour. The season began on 6 October 2013 with the Tour of Almaty and ended on 20 December 2014 with the Tour of Al Zubarah.

The points leader, based on the cumulative results of previous races, wears the UCI Asia Tour cycling jersey. Julián Arredondo from Colombia is the defending champion of the 2012–13 UCI Asia Tour.

Throughout the season, points are awarded to the top finishers of stages within stage races and the final general classification standings of each of the stages races and one-day events. The quality and complexity of a race also determine how many points are awarded to the top finishers, the higher the UCI rating of a race, the more points are awarded.

The UCI ratings from highest to lowest are as follows:
 Multi-day events: 2.HC, 2.1 and 2.2
 One-day events: 1.HC, 1.1 and 1.2

Events

2013

2014

External links
 

UCI Asia Tour
2014 in men's road cycling
2013 in men's road cycling
UCI
UCI